Consuelo Hernandez is an American politician. She is a Democratic member of the Arizona House of Representatives elected to represent District 21 in 2022. She is president of the Sunnyside Unified School District.  

Hernandez was raised in Pima County, Arizona and attended Sunnyside schools. She completed a bachelor's degree in global health from the Arizona State University. Hernandez earned a master's in legal studies with a concentration in economics from the University of Arizona.  

Hernandez is of Mexican-Jewish descent. She and her sister Alma Hernandez converted to Judaism after learning their maternal grandfather was Jewish. She attends Congregation Chaverim in Tucson, Arizona. Daniel Hernández Jr. is her brother.  

Hernandez is president of the Sunnyside Unified School District.

References

External links 

 
 Biography at Ballotpedia

Democratic Party members of the Arizona House of Representatives
Living people
Year of birth missing (living people)
21st-century American women politicians
Politicians from Tucson, Arizona
Women state legislators in Arizona
American politicians of Mexican descent
American people of Mexican-Jewish descent
Jewish American state legislators in Arizona
21st-century American Jews
Converts to Judaism
Hernandez family
Hispanic and Latino American state legislators in Arizona
21st-century American politicians
Arizona State University alumni
University of Arizona alumni
Hispanic and Latino American women in politics